Jennifer McHugh (born 27 November 1957) is a Canadian former swimmer. She competed in two events at the 1972 Summer Olympics.

References

External links
 
 
 

1957 births
Living people
Canadian female swimmers
Olympic swimmers of Canada
Swimmers at the 1972 Summer Olympics
Swimmers from Vancouver
20th-century Canadian women
21st-century Canadian women